Dasab Airlines was an airline based in Abuja, Nigeria.

Code data
ICAO Code: DSQ
Callsign: DASAB AIR

History
The Nigerian government set a deadline for airlines operating in the country to re-capitalize on April 30, 2007. Dasab Airlines, along with six others, failed to make the deadline, and was therefore disallowed from Nigeria's airspace.

Corporate affairs
The airline's head office was in Abuja. Its Lagos office was in Agege, Lagos State.

Fleet
As of August 2006 the Dasab Airlines fleet included:
2 Boeing 727-200

References

External links
Dasab Airlines (Archive)

Defunct airlines of Nigeria
Airlines disestablished in 2007
2007 disestablishments in Nigeria
Economy of Abuja